Hideous and Perfect is third studio album by Australian electro-industrial band Angelspit. Released on 9 September 2009, it marks the shortest time between two consecutive Angelspit albums, with Blood Death Ivory being released in 2008. A music video for "Fuck the Revolution" was released. On 10 October 2010 a remix album entitled Larva Pupa Tank Coffin was released featuring four new songs and remixes by both Angelspit themselves as well as other artists. Also released along with the album was a music video for the song "Sleep Now". A second remix album, Carbon Beauty, was released 8 March 2011, featuring three new songs and nine remixes.

Track listing

External links
Hideous and Perfect Album site

2009 albums
Angelspit albums